Thomas Hastings  (1733-1794) was a clergyman in the Church of Ireland during the 18th century.

Hastings was educated at Trinity College, Dublin.  He was Precentor of St Patrick's Cathedral, Dublin from 1781 to 1785; and Archdeacon of Dublin from 1785 until his death.

References

Archdeacons of Dublin
Alumni of Trinity College Dublin
18th-century Irish Anglican priests
1794 deaths
1733 births